The 2010 Atlantic 10 Conference Baseball Championship was held from May 26 through 29 at Campbell's Field in Camden, New Jersey. It featured the top six regular-season finishers of the conference's 14 teams. Fifth-seeded Saint Louis defeated Charlotte in the title game to win the tournament for the second time, earning the A-10's automatic bid to the 2010 NCAA Tournament.

Seeding 
The league's top six teams, based on winning percentage in the 27-game regular-season schedule, were seeded one through six. The top two seeds, Charlotte and Xavier, received byes into the second round of play in the double elimination tournament.

Bracket

All-Tournament Team 
The following players were named to the All-Tournament Team. Saint Louis's Bryant Cotton, one of four Billikens selected, was named Most Outstanding Player.

Rhode Island's Tom Coulombe and Xavier's Bobby Freking, both chosen in 2009, were second-time selections.

References 

Tournament
Atlantic 10 Conference Baseball Tournament
Atlantic 10 Conference baseball tournament
Atlantic 10 Conference baseball tournament
Baseball in New Jersey
College sports in New Jersey
History of Camden, New Jersey
Sports competitions in New Jersey
Sports in Camden, New Jersey
Tourist attractions in Camden, New Jersey